is a railway station in the city of Fukushima, Fukushima Prefecture, Japan. The station is the terminus for the JR East Yamagata Shinkansen, and Ōu Main Line, as well as the third-sector Abukuma Express Line and privately operated Fukushima Kotsu Iizaka Line.

Lines
JR East
Tohoku Shinkansen
Yamagata Shinkansen
Tōhoku Main Line
Ōu Main Line
Abukuma Express
 Abukuma Express Line
Fukushima Transportation
 Iizaka Line

Station layout

The station is separated into an east and a west section. Within the area after entering the ticket gates, the opposite sections of the station are accessible via a pedestrian tunnel that runs over the tracks. Outside of the ticketed area, pedestrians must use a tunnel to access the opposite section. Cyclists and other vehicles must utilize the bridges to either the north or south of the station.

All lines, except for the Abukuma Express Line and the Iizaka Line, are accessible through the main entrance of the East or West sections of the station. The Abukuma Express Line and the Iizaka Line have a separate entrance on the Northeast side of the station.

The JR portion of the station uses one side platform, one island platform and one bay platform (with two bays) to serve a total of six tracks for regular trains, and two elevated island platforms for Shinkansen operations. The station has a Midori no Madoguchi staffed ticket office. The Abukuma Express Line and the Fukushima Kōtsū Iizaka Line share a single island platform.

History
Nippon Railway opened Fukushima Station and the railway between Kōriyama Station and Shiogama Station (later called Shiogamakō Station) on December 15, 1887. This railway was later nationalized and named the Tōhoku Main Line. The government railways opened the railway, later named the Ōu Main Line, between Fukushima Station and Yonezawa Station on May 15, 1899.
The Tōhoku Shinkansen opened on June 23, 1982 and the Abukuma Express Line opened on July 1, 1988.

Through services between the Tōhoku Shinkansen and the Ōu Main Line, under the name Yamagata Shinkansen, began on July 1, 1992.

JR East announced in 2020 a plan to construct an elevated crossing serving the Yamagata Shinkansen to rectify bottleneck issues with Tokyo-bound Yamabiko trains having to cross over to Platform 14 to connect with Tsubasa trains. The new line will consist of 760 m of surface level track and 540 m of elevated viaduct connecting to Platform 11. Estimated date of completion is 2026.

Bus terminals

Highway buses 
 For Minamisōma, Haranomachi Station, Kashima Station (Fukushima)
 For Sōma
 For Nihonmatsu, Koriyama Women's University, Kōriyama Station
 For Nihonmatsu, Ono, Iwaki Station, Iwaki-Taira Velodrome
 For Nihonmatsu, Aizu-Wakamatsu Station, Aizuwakamatsu Castle
 For Sendai Station (Miyagi)
 Abukuma; For Ōji Station (Tokyo), Ikebukuro Station, Shinjuku Station
 For Narita International Airport
 Dream Fukushima/Yokohama; For Tokyo Station and Yokohama Station
 Rainbow; For Tokyo Station and Hamamatsuchō Bus Terminal
 Galaxy; For Kyōto Station, Ōsaka Station, Ōsaka Namba Station(Osaka City Air Terminal), Ōsaka Abenobashi Station and Universal Studios Japan

Passenger statistics
In fiscal year 2016, the station was used by an average of 16,536 passengers daily (boarding passengers only).

Surrounding area
Fukushima Station is located in the centre of the city of Fukushima.

See also

List of railway stations in Japan

References

External links

 JR East Station information 
  Abukuma Express Station information 
 Fukushima Kōtsū Station information 

Stations of East Japan Railway Company
Abukuma Express Line
Ōu Main Line
Railway stations in Fukushima Prefecture
Tōhoku Main Line
Tōhoku Shinkansen
Yamagata Shinkansen
Fukushima Kōtsū Iizaka Line
Railway stations in Japan opened in 1887
Fukushima (city)